A whale tail often refers to the tail of a whale.

Whale tail may also refer to:

 Whale tail, colloquially, is the Y-shaped waistband of a thong when visible above the waistline of low-rise jeans
 Whale's Tail Beach, a beach in Destin, Florida
 Whale's Tail Beach, a beach in Puntarenas, Costa Rica
 Whale's Tail Beach, a beach in Sandy Bay, Jamaica
 California specialty license plate
 Whale tail (automotive spoiler), particularly on the 1974 Porsche 911 Turbo
Reverence, a sculpture also called Whale Tails created by Jim Sardonis